The Tlokwe Ruins are the remains of Sotho-Tswana settlements on the hills surrounding Fochville in Gauteng, South Africa. They were inhabited until the inhabitants were driven away by Mzilikazi in the 1820s.

The Sotho-Tswana people lived in this area for roughly 300 years before the 1815-1840 Difaqane and the 1815-1816 volcanic winter. They farmed sorghum, maize and cattle in the fertile valleys and had a thriving community. During the Difaqane they accepted refugees from the south and eventually, caving in to both population and environmental pressures, moved toward the Brits area.

References

Archaeological sites in South Africa
Ruins in South Africa
Archaeological sites of Southern Africa